William Staniforth (1749-1834) was an English surgeon, notable for being one of the first surgeons at the Sheffield Royal Infirmary.

William was the son of Samuel Staniforth (1725-1811) and Mary Ash. His brother Samuel (1747-1824) was a linen draper, and lived next door to William on Castle Street. William was well known for his Oculist business named Staniforth's Eye Ointment. In the 1876 publication Reminiscences of Old Sheffield: Its Streets and Its People William is described as being 'the best operative surgeon and oculist in town'.

Staniforth retired in 1819 and died on 21 August 1833. He was buried in Attercliffe Chapel. Prior to the Infirmary being redeveloped, a medallion was placed on the wall of the Board Room.

References 

1740s births
British surgeons
People from Sheffield
1833 deaths
Medical doctors from Yorkshire